Gianni Bettini (1860, Novara – 27 February 1938, San Remo) was a gentleman inventor and a pioneer audiophile who invented several phonograph improvements. He is best known for having made the first (and in some cases only) recordings of the voices of several very famous singers and other celebrities of the 1890s. Few of these recordings have survived.

Life and career

Bettini was born in Novara, Italy. In the 1890s he was a New York socialite, living in the swanky Central Park South neighborhood now in the center of Midtown on the edge of the Theater District. It was there that he kept his salon and operated his phonograph laboratory.

Bettini made a number of high-end phonographs that are highly sought-after today. He invented the Micro-Recorder and Micro-Reproducer, recording and playback devices that improved the sound quality of recordings made on brown wax phonograph cylinders, the first commercially practical recording medium. There were many models and refinements but they all centered on the attachment of the stylus to the diaphragm by a multi-legged unit he called a "spider". Most of his inventions were marketed to an affluent clientele comprising the first generation of what would now be called audiophiles. One of his later inventions was a universal speed indicator, a device that aided the fine speed adjustment of a phonograph motor (at 120 rpm).

Bettini was personally acquainted with many famous musicians and other public figures and he persuaded some of them to make recordings during visits to his New York salon. He recorded Mark Twain, ex-President Benjamin Harrison and a number of the outstanding singers and instrumentalists of the 1890s, some of whom made no other recordings. Eventually, Bettini began selling copies of some of his cylinders. His catalog of opera recordings was 12 pages long and the cylinders cost as much as US$6 (equivalent to roughly $150 in early 21st century dollars) at a time when typical commercial cylinder records sold for 50 cents. Some of Bettini's most desirable recordings, such as those of the legendary tenor Jean de Reszke, had been made purely as an experiment and a personal favor to the inventor and were not listed, but the catalog intimated that copies of some unlisted items might be obtained by private arrangement.

1898 was established the French Société des Micro-Phonographes Bettini with a capital of 850 000 francs in Paris, 23, boulevard des Capucines. 
Before World War I, Bettini brought his collection of master recordings to France. During World War II, most of them were lost when the warehouse they were stored in (reputedly) was destroyed in an air raid. Due to the combination of that loss, the very small number of copies previously produced, and the fragile and chemically unstable nature of the wax medium, Bettini cylinders are now extremely rare; a few dozen are known to exist. Only the recordings he made of an elderly Pope Leo XIII just before his death in 1903 (not in 1884, as mistakenly reported in some 2014 news items about papal recordings) were more widely distributed and have consequently survived in multiple copies in both the cylinder and disc formats.

During the years 1901 to 1903, New York Metropolitan Opera librarian Lionel Mapleson used an Edison Phonograph upgraded with a Bettini Micro-Recorder to record hundreds of brief excerpts of live on-stage performances, known as the Mapleson Cylinders. Like Bettini, Mapleson captured the voices of singers including those who never made commercial recordings.

Bettini died in 1938 in San Remo, Italy.

Other inventions
Later in his career Bettini invented an unusual motion picture camera for amateur use which photographed the frames as an X–Y array on a flat glass plate, but it was not commercialized.

References

External links
 
 Bettini Phonograph Reproducers

1860 births
1938 deaths
19th-century Italian inventors
People from Novara
Italian audio engineers
Cylinder record producers